Paul Clatney (born December 5, 1963) is a former Canadian football linebacker/defensive back who played six seasons in the Canadian Football League (CFL) with the Winnipeg Blue Bombers, Calgary Stampeders, Ottawa Rough Riders and Toronto Argonauts. He was drafted by the Hamilton Tiger-Cats in the eighth round of the 1986 CFL Draft and spent parts of 2 seasons (1986–87) on their practise roster. He played CIS football at McMaster University.

College career
Clatney played 2 years of CIAU football for the McMaster Marauders. He was the Marauder’s rookie of the year in 1985, and an OUAA All-Star and CIAU All-Canadian in 1986. He also wrestled four years for the Marauders, winning silver and bronze medals at the CIAU Championships. Clatney was a member of Ontario University Athletic Association championship wrestling teams in 1985 and 1986. He was also on the CIAU championship team in 1985. He won one silver and two OUAA individual championships (gold). Clatney was induced into McMaster University’s Athletic Hall of Fame in 2009 and once again in 2015 as a team member of the 1985 CIAU championship wrestling team.

Professional career
Clatney was selected by the Hamilton Tiger-Cats with the 71st pick in the 1986 CFL draft. He participated in 2 exhibition games and spent the entire season on the practise roster, except for the months of September and October while he returned to university to play a second season for the McMaster Marauders. The Tiger-Cats won the 74th Grey Cup in 1986.

He was a member of the Hamilton Tiger-Cats practise roster for 13 games in 1987 before joining the  Winnipeg Blue Bombers practice roster for the last 5 games and the playoffs. Clatney then  played in every game for the Blue Bombers in 1988 and 1989, winning the 76th Grey Cup in 1988.

Clatney played for the Calgary Stampeders from 1990 to 1992, winning the 80th Grey Cup in 1992. He also set a CFL record in 1991 for the most special teams tackles in one game, with seven.

He played for the Ottawa Rough Riders in 1994 before a midseason trade to the   Toronto Argonauts, where he concluded his career. 
Paul was inducted into the Manitoba Sports Hall of Fame in 2014 as a member of the 1988 Grey Cup Champion Winnipeg Blue Bombers.

Other sports
Clatney attended high school at West Humber Collegiate Institute in Etobicoke, a western suburb of Toronto, from 1977-82. He was the Vikings Athlete of the Year after competing in Volleyball, Wrestling, Field Lacrosse, and Track & Field during his senior year.

Clatney competed in Amateur Freestyle Wrestling and was the Gold Medallist at the 1982 Ontario Jr. Wrestling Championships at 82 kg and then finished 5th at the Canadian Junior Championships. He also won a gold medal in the 90 kg division at the 1983 Canada Winter Games in Chicoutimi, Quebec.

Clatney had a tryout with his hometown Toronto Blue Jays in 1984, after being scouted by legendary Amateur scout Bob Prentice, while playing for the Rexdale Braves in the Leaside Junior Baseball League.

Clatney was a member of the Canadian Bobsled team from 1988 to 1990, winning a bronze medal in the two-man event as a brakeman with driver Greg Haydenluck at the World Cup in Calgary in 1989.

Clatney played professional inline hockey for the Calgary Rad'z of Roller Hockey International in 1993. He also played professional  ice hockey for the Madison Monsters of the Colonial Hockey League during the 1995–96 season.

Personal life
Clatney has worked as a firefighter since his playing career. He, along with eight other former CFL players who were policeman or firemen, took part in the 100th Grey Cup festivities.

References

External links
Just Sports Stats

1963 births
Calgary Rad'z players
Calgary Stampeders players
Canadian firefighters
Canadian football defensive backs
Canadian ice hockey forwards
Canadian male bobsledders
Ice hockey people from Ontario
Living people
Madison Monsters players
McMaster Marauders football players
Ottawa Rough Riders players
Players of Canadian football from Ontario
Canadian football people from Toronto
Toronto Argonauts players
Winnipeg Blue Bombers players
Canadian male sport wrestlers